Hatfield is a town in western Polk County, Arkansas, United States. The population was 413 at the 2010 census.

Geography
Hatfield is located at  (34.486997, -94.378304).

According to the United States Census Bureau, the town has a total area of 3.5 km2 (1.4 mi2), all land.

Demographics

As of the census of 2000, there were 402 people, 163 households, and 106 families residing in the town.  The population density was 114.1/km2 (296.2/mi2).  There were 185 housing units at an average density of 52.5/km2 (136.3/mi2).  The racial makeup of the town was 95.52% White, 0.50% Black or African American, 1.49% Native American, and 2.49% from two or more races.  1.24% of the population were Hispanic or Latino of any race.

There were 163 households, out of which 28.8% had children under the age of 18 living with them, 52.8% were married couples living together, 10.4% had a female householder with no husband present, and 34.4% were non-families. 31.9% of all households were made up of individuals, and 19.0% had someone living alone who was 65 years of age or older.  The average household size was 2.47 and the average family size was 3.07.

In the town, the population was spread out, with 25.4% under the age of 18, 8.7% from 18 to 24, 21.9% from 25 to 44, 25.4% from 45 to 64, and 18.7% who were 65 years of age or older.  The median age was 39 years. For every 100 females, there were 90.5 males.  For every 100 females age 18 and over, there were 89.9 males.

The median income for a household in the town was $19,412, and the median income for a family was $23,750. Males had a median income of $18,438 versus $16,875 for females. The per capita income for the town was $10,447.  About 22.6% of families and 25.6% of the population were below the poverty line, including 44.7% of those under age 18 and 16.7% of those age 65 or over.

Climate
The climate in this area is characterized by hot, humid summers and generally mild to cool winters.  According to the Köppen Climate Classification system, Hatfield has a humid subtropical climate, abbreviated "Cfa" on climate maps.

Education
Residents are assigned to schools in the Mena School District.

On July 1, 2004 the Hatfield School District was consolidated into the Mena School District.

Other
The headquarters of the Christian Motorcyclists Association is located in Hatfield.

References

External links
 Encyclopedia of Arkansas History & Culture entry

Towns in Polk County, Arkansas
Towns in Arkansas